Comadia bertholdi, the lupine borer moth, is a moth in the family Cossidae. It is found in the United States, where it has been recorded from Washington, Colorado, Wyoming, Arizona, California, Nevada and New Mexico.

The length of the forewings is 13–17 mm for males and 18–19 mm for females. The ground colour of the forewings ranges from light grey to dark ash, with black suffusion. Adults have been recorded on wing from April to August.

The larvae feed on Lupinus species.

Subspecies
Comadia bertholdi bertholdi (California, Colorado, Wyoming)
Comadia bertholdi indistincta Brown, 1976 (California)
Comadia bertholdi polingi Barnes & Benjamin, 1927 (Arizona, California, Nevada, New Mexico)

References

Natural History Museum Lepidoptera generic names catalog

Cossinae
Moths described in 1880
Moths of North America